The 1948 Columbia Lions football team was an American football team that represented Columbia University as an independent during the 1948 college football season. 

In their 19th season under head coach Lou Little, the Lions compiled a 4–5 record, but outscored their opponents 194 to 177. Team captains were chosen on a game-by-game basis, and included, in schedule order, Gene Shekitka, Henry Briggs, Charles Klemovich, Lou Kusserow, Gene Rossides, John Nork, Joe Jaras, Bill Olson and Clyde Hampton.  

Columbia played its home games at Baker Field in Upper Manhattan, in New York City.

Schedule

References

Columbia
Columbia Lions football seasons
Columbia Lions football